Vito Giusto Scozzari (January 26, 1918 – June 5, 1996), also known as Vito Scotti, was an American character actor who played both dramatic and comedy roles on Broadway, in films, and later on television, primarily from the late 1930s to the mid-1990s. He was known as a man of a thousand faces for his ability to assume so many divergent roles in more than 200 screen appearances in a career spanning 50 years and for his resourceful portrayals of various ethnic types. Of Italian heritage, he played everything from a Mexican bandit, to a Russian doctor, to a Japanese sailor, to an Indian travel agent.

Early life and career

Vito Giusto Scozzari was born 26 Jan 1918 in San Francisco, California. He was the son of Giusto and Virginia Ambroselli Scozzari. His family spent the early 1920s in Naples. The family returned to the United States on 4 July 1924 and lived briefly at 802 South 8th Street in Philadelphia before moving to New York City the following year.

In 1925, after the Scozzari family had returned to the United States, his mother became a diva in New York City theater circles and his father an impresario. Scotti worked the night club circuit as a stand-up magician and Mime artist mainly following the Commedia dell'arte style. He made his debut on Broadway in Pinocchio, where he played a small role.

Film
After serving in World War II, Scotti entered movies and television in the late 1940s. He made his film debut with a trio of uncredited roles in 1949.

By 1953, Scotti replaced J. Carrol Naish as Luigi Basco, an Italian immigrant who ran a Chicago antique store, on the television version of the radio show Life with Luigi. Five years later, he portrayed another "ethnic" character, Rama from India (among other characters) in the live-action segment "Gunga Ram" on the Andy Devine children's show, Andy's Gang,
where he also played a foil to the trickster Froggy the Gremlin. He was cast as French Duclos in the 1959 episode "Deadly Tintype" of the NBC Western series, The Californians.

In 1955, Scotti was reportedly injured while filming with an Elephant named Emma. Emma was reportedly spooked by the faux flora used to dress the set. The elephant shook Scotti and fellow actor Nino Marcel from her back. Scotti suffered a concussion and broken arm. Scotti would work successfully with animals later in his career.

In 1963, Scotti was cast as the Italian farmer Vincenzo Peruggia in the episode "The Tenth Mona Lisa" of the CBS anthology series, General Electric True, hosted by Jack Webb. In the episode set in the year 1911, Peruggia steals the Mona Lisa from the Louvre museum in Paris but is apprehended by a French detective when he attempts to unload the painting on an art dealer.

He also appeared in television series, such as How to Marry a Millionaire (as Jules in the 1958 episode "Loco and the Gambler"), in four episodes of The Rifleman, Rescue 8 (1959), State Trooper (1959), Sugarfoot (1959), The Texan (1959), Johnny Staccato (1960), The Twilight Zone (Mr. Bevis), (1960), The Twilight Zone (The Gift), (1962), The Investigators (1961), Target: The Corruptors! (1962), Lassie, Stoney Burke (1963), The Wide Country (1963), Dr. Kildare (1963), Going My Way (1963), Breaking Point (1963), The Dick Van Dyke Show (1963), The Addams Family (1964–1965), and The Andy Griffith Show (The Gypsies) (1966).

Scotti appeared in two episodes of  Bonanza, in Gunsmoke (1965–1970), The Man from U.N.C.L.E. (1965 and 1967), The Wild Wild West, Ironside, The Monkees, The Flying Nun, Get Smart, Hogan's Heroes, as one of The Penguin's henchmen in two episodes of Batman, two episodes of The Bionic Woman (1976), and two episodes of The Golden Girls (1988-1989). He played Geppetto in "Geppetto's Workshop" in the 1980s.

He appeared four times on Gilligan's Island in the 1960s: in season one, episode 15 (1964–65) as a Japanese sailor who did not know World War II was over, later in season one, episode 31, as the same sailor in scenes where Ginger, the skipper, and Mister Howell reflect in diaries on their versions of how a rescue transpired in the above-mentioned episode 15, and twice as Dr. Boris Balinkoff, a mad scientist, in seasons two and three. He appeared in 5 episodes (1973-1975) of the original Columbo, as a befuddled maître d’, a snobbish clothing store salesman, a soliciting undertaker, an erudite street bum, and a soybean wholesaler, and in one episode (1989) as Vito when the series was revived.

Scotti was cast as a Mexican bandit in two one-hour episodes of Zorro titled "El Bandido" and "Adios El Cuchillo" alongside Gilbert Roland, and an Italian restaurant owner in episode 35 of season one of Bewitched.

The actor appeared in hundreds of film and television roles, including a prominent role as the "Italian Train Engineer" in Von Ryan's Express who leads the escaped prisoners to Switzerland, as Nazorine in The Godfather (1972), as Vittorio in Chu Chu and the Philly Flash (1981), and most notably as the scene-stealing cook in How Sweet It Is! (1968). In the pivotal scene, Scotti grabs a flustered Debbie Reynolds and plants a kiss on her midriff.

He portrayed Colonel Enrico Ferrucci in The Secret War of Harry Frigg (1968) and later appeared in the Academy Award-winning comedy Cactus Flower (1969), as Señor Arturo Sánchez, who unsuccessfully tries to seduce Ingrid Bergman's character.

He voiced the Italian Cat in the Walt Disney animated film The Aristocats (1970), and appeared with Lindsay Wagner on her television special, Another Side of Me (1977). His last screen performance was as the manager at Vesuvio's in the criminal comedy Get Shorty (1995).

Death
Scotti died of lung cancer at the Motion Picture & Television Country House and Hospital in Woodland Hills, California, on June 5, 1996. He was interred at Hollywood Forever Cemetery, with his first wife Irene, in the Abbey of the Psalms Mausoleum.

Personal life
In addition to his accomplishments as an actor, Scotti was highly regarded as a cook. He loved cooking, especially the recipes of his beloved mother and grandmother. Two generations of Hollywood's top names always left his dinner parties raving about the food and wine. Scotti also enjoyed painting in his spare time.

Scotti was married to former Peruvian Flamenco dancer Irene A. Scozzari from 1949 until her death at age 54 on April 15, 1979. They had two children together; Carmen Antoinette (born 1953) and Ricardo Antonio (born 1956). After Irene's death, Vito married Beverly Scotti. They were together until his death. Scotti was a dedicated fundraiser for the "Carmen Fund", set up by the Joaquin Miller High School Parents Guild, to assist the school's special-needs students. The fund was named after the Scotti's daughter, one of the first patients to undergo pioneering spinal implant surgery.

Filmography

 Criss Cross (1949) as Track Usher (uncredited)
 Illegal Entry (1949) as Mexican Youth (uncredited)
 East Side, West Side (1949) as Sistina Son (uncredited)
 The Capture (1950) as Truck Driver (uncredited)
 Deported (1950) as Guido's Henchman (uncredited)
 Up Front (1951) as Sergeant Clerk (uncredited)
 Stop That Cab (1951) as Henry (uncredited)
 The Light Touch (1951) as Hotel Clerk (uncredited)
 The Fabulous Senorita (1952) as Esteban Gonzales
 Bal Tabarin (1952) as Police Secretary (uncredited)
 The Miracle of Our Lady of Fatima (1952) as Villager (uncredited)
 Assignment – Paris! (1952) as Italian Reporter (uncredited)
 Shield for Murder (1954) as Joe—Bartender (uncredited)
 Sabaka (1954) as Rama
 Conquest of Space (1955) as Sanella
 The Broken Star (1956) as Pepe (uncredited)
 The Black Orchid (1958) as Paul Gallo (uncredited)
 Party Girl (1958) as Hotel Clerk (uncredited)
 Pay or Die (1960) as Officer Simonetti
 The Facts of Life (1960) as Fishing Boat Driver (uncredited)
 Where the Boys Are (1960) as Maitre D' of The Tropical Isle (uncredited)
 Gold of the Seven Saints (1961) as Gondara's Cook (uncredited)
 Master of the World (1961) as Topage 
 The Explosive Generation (1961) as H.S. - Custodian
 Pocketful of Miracles (1961) as Priest (uncredited)
 Saint of Devil's Island (1961) as Louis
 Two Weeks in Another Town (1962) as Assistant Director
 The Courtship of Eddie's Father (1963) as Rick - Flute Player (uncredited)
 Dime with a Halo (1963) as Doorman
 Captain Newman, M.D. (1963) as Maj. Alfredo Fortuno
 Wild and Wonderful (1964) as Andre
 Honeymoon Hotel (1964) as Waiter (uncredited)
 Rio Conchos (1964) as Mexican Bandit
 The Pleasure Seekers (1964) as Neighborhood Man
 Von Ryan's Express (1965) as Italian Train Engineer
 Made in Paris (1966) as Fedya (uncredited)
 Blindfold (1966) as Michaelangelo Vincenti
 What Did You Do in the War, Daddy? (1966) as Frederico
 Warning Shot (1967) as Designer
 The Caper of the Golden Bulls (1967) as François Morel
 The Perils of Pauline (1967) as Frandisi
 The Secret War of Harry Frigg (1968) as Col. Enrico Ferrucci
 How Sweet It Is! (1968) as Cook
 Head (1968) as I. Vitteloni
 Cactus Flower (1969) as Señor Arturo Sánchez
 The Boatniks (1970) as Pepe Galindo
 The Aristocats (1970) as Peppo - Italian Cat (voice)
 The Godfather (1972) as Nazorine
 Napoleon and Samantha (1972) as The Clown
 When the Legends Die (1972) as Meo (Dillon's caretaker)
 The Bull of the West (1972)
 The World's Greatest Athlete (1973) as Games spectator
 How to Seduce a Woman (1974) as Bill
 Herbie Rides Again (1974) as Taxi Driver
 The Wild McCullochs (1975) as Tony, the Bartender
 I Wonder Who's Killing Her Now? (1976) as Col. Guido Ameche
 The Big Bus (1976) as Barber
 Paesano: A Voice in the Night (1977) as Al Lozio
 Zero to Sixty (1978) as Benny
 The One Man Jury (1978) as Poker Player #9
 The Nude Bomb (1980) as Italian Delegate
 Herbie Goes Bananas (1980) as Armando Moccia
 Chu Chu and the Philly Flash (1981) aa Vittorio
 Stewardess School (1986) as Carl Stromboli
 Side Roads (1988)
 Beverly Hills Brats (1989) as Jerry
 Loaded Weapon 1 (1993) as Tailor
 Get Shorty (1995) as Manager at Vesuvio's

Television

 Andy's Gang (1955-1957)
 How to Marry a Millionaire (1958) as Jules
 The Lucy–Desi Comedy Hour (1958) as Shop Owner
 Rescue 8 (1959) as Dal Singh
 Perry Mason (1959) as Joseph D'Amato
 Sugarfoot (1959) as Ramon Acquistapace
 State Trooper (1959) as Reggie Sorbin
 Playhouse 90 (1959) as Cabinet Minister
 Peter Gunn (1959) as Pete's Guest / Herman Klip / Joe
 Wagon Train (1959) as Tony
 Tales of Wells Fargo (1959-1961) as Joe Caboose / Abner Dabler / Mr. Mute
 Johnny Staccato (1960) as Carlos Lascaratti
 Cheyenne (1960 episode "Counterfeit Gun") as Julio
 Zorro (1960) as Chato
 The Real McCoys (1960-1961) as Pablo / Carlos
 Bonanza (1961, 2 episodes) as Pooch / Leon Flores
 The Investigators (1961, episode "A Man of Means")
 Rawhide (1962) as Manuel
 Target: The Corruptors! (1962) as Garcia
 The Twilight Zone (1960-1962) as Rudolpho / Peddler
 Lassie (1962) as Magico the Great
 The Dick Powell Show (1961-1963) as Karam / Dolpho
 Stoney Burke (1963) as Polo
 The Dick Van Dyke Show (1963) as Vito Giotto
 Breaking Point (1963) as Tony
 Going My Way (1963) as Mr. Molletti
 The Wide Country (1963) as Carlos Grijalves
 The Rifleman (1962-1963) as Alphonso / Marcello Ciabini / Soto
 The Joey Bishop Show (1963) as Supermarket Manager / Frank the Barber
 My Favorite Martian (1963-1964) as Waiter / Junkyard Manager
 Bob Hope Presents the Chrysler Theatre (1963-1964) as The Lieutenant / Harry
 The Danny Thomas Show (1964) as The Tailor
 The Donna Reed Show (1964) as Prince Georgivani
 Dr. Kildare (1962-1964) as Signore Fortuno / Jesus Munoz / Grocer
 The Jack Benny Program (1961-1965) as Mexican Captain / Mexican cafeteria employee
 Bewitched (1965) as Mario
 Laredo (1965) as Chicho
 The Virginian (1965) as Gilly
 The Addams Family (1964-1965) as Sam Picasso / Professor Altshuler / Miri Haan
 The Farmer's Daughter (1964-1965) as Llewellyn / Ambassador Cortez
 The Andy Griffith Show (1966) as Murrillos (Episode, "The Gypsies")
 The Lucy Show (1962-1966) as Sam Boscovitch / Fencing Instructor
 The Munsters (1965-1966) as Roman Broadcaster / Man on Radio
 The John Forsythe Show (1966) as Gonzales
 Gilligan's Island (1965-1966) as Japanese Sailor / Dr. Boris Balinkoff 
 Batman (1966) as Matey Dee
 The Wild Wild West (1966) as Cefalu
 Rango (1967) as El Carnicero (Episode: "Viva Rango")
 The Monkees (1967) as Dr. Marcovich
 The Girl from U.N.C.L.E. (1967) as Dr. Igor Gork
 The Man from U.N.C.L.E. (1965-1967) as Beirut / Charles Chikhli
 Daniel Boone (1967) as Priest
 The Flying Nun (1967-1969) as Capt. Gaspar Fomento / Captain Dominic Lopez
 Hogan's Heroes (1969) as Major Bonacelli
 Ironside (1969) as Manuel Rodriguez Sr.
 Get Smart (1965-1970) as Gino Columbus / Dante
 Gunsmoke (1965-1970) as The Indian / Indiana / Savrin / Torreon
 To Rome with Love (TV series) (1969-1971) as Nico
 Barefoot in the Park (1970) as Victor Velasquez
 The Odd Couple (1971) as Pepe
 The Brady Bunch (1971) as Cooking Show Host (voice, uncredited)
 The Six Million Dollar Man (1973) as 2nd Taxi Driver
 McMillan & Wife (1971-1974) as Sykes / Alonzo / Guido Barteloni
 Get Christie Love! (1974) as Emilio
 Adam-12 (1974) as Charley Prender
 Shaft (1974) Murder One / The Killing
 The Bionic Woman (1976) as Romero
 Monster Squad (1976) as Albert/Alberta
 Police Woman (1977) as Luigi
 C.P.O. Sharkey (1977) as Vito
 Baretta (1977) as Franco
 Happy Days (1979) as Otto
 Charlie's Angels (1980) as Tyrone
 Hawaii Five-O (1980) as Bill Baskin
 Vega$ (1980-1981) as Casino Manager / Valeria Viceria
 Hart to Hart (1981) as Vito
 Fantasy Island (1979-1982) as Vito Orsotti / Antoine de Vouvray
 CHiPs (1977-1983) as Charles / Emilio
 Walt Disney's Wonderful World of Color (1975-1983) as Games Spectator / Taxi Driver / Pepe Galindo
 Trapper John, M.D. (1984)
 Who's the Boss? (1985 & 1988) as Uncle Aldo Micelli
 Charles in Charge (1988) as Dino Firenzi
 The Golden Girls (1988-1989) as Dominic Bosco / Vincenzo
 Columbo (1973-1989) as Vito / Salvatore Defonte / Thomas Dolan / Mr. Grindell / Chadwick / Maitre d'
 The Fanelli Boys (1990) as Sicilian #1
 Northern Exposure (1992) as Godfather
 Empty Nest (1994) as Mr. Tartaglia
 Mad About You (1995) as Antonio

References

External links
 
 
 
 
 

1918 births
1996 deaths
20th-century American male actors
Male actors from California
American male film actors
American people of Italian descent
American male stage actors
American male television actors
Burials at Hollywood Forever Cemetery
Deaths from lung cancer in California
Male actors from San Francisco